Catocala xizangensis is a moth in the family Erebidae. It is found in China (Xizang).

References

xizangensis
Moths described in 1991
Moths of Asia